Melissa Tantaquidgeon Zobel (born Melissa Jayne Fawcett; March 24, 1960) is a Mohegan author, historian, and storyteller who serves as both the Medicine Woman and Tribal Historian for the Mohegan Tribe. In addition, she is executive director of the tribe's cultural and community programs department. Also a prolific writer, Zobel has published many books including the historical biography, Medicine Trail: The Life and Lessons of Gladys Tantaquidgeon, and the futuristic novel Oracles.  Some publications appear under her maiden name of Melissa Jayne Fawcett.

Family
Melissa Tantaquidgeon Zobel was born Melissa Jayne Fawcett, the daughter of Dr. Richard Fawcett and Nonner Jayne Fawcett (a Mohegan). She and her husband, Randy Zobel, live in Mystic, Connecticut and have three adult children:
She has three children: Madeline, Rachel, and David.

Education
Tantaquidgeon Zobel served as high school president of The Williams School in New London, Connecticut. After receiving her B.S.F.S. in History and Diplomacy from Georgetown University, where she was both a member of the Phi Alpha Theta History Honor Society and recipient of the Lorenze Tsosie Native American Scholarship. Zobel earned an M.A. in history from the University of Connecticut—the school from which both her mother and great-aunt, Dr. Gladys Tantaquidgeon, received degrees.

Both are prominent Mohegan figures. Jayne Fawcett grew up on the home site of Reverend Samson Occom, one of the first Christian American Indian ministers. Gladys Tantaquidgeon founded what is now the oldest Indian-run museum in the United States, the Tantaquidgeon Indian Museum, in 1931. Dr. Tantaquidgeon also trained the young Zobel in tribal oral traditions, beliefs and sacred practices. Following her death on November 1, 2005, Dr. Gladys Tantaquidgeon's life and accomplishments were acknowledged in a New York Times article.

In 2012, Tantaquidgeon Zobel earned the degree of M.F.A. from Fairfield University.

Career
Zobel has served as the storyteller of the Mohegan Tribe and traveled all throughout New England. She has held a number of prestigious tribal positions and elected posts, including the Mohegan Federal Recognition Coordinator from 1992 to 1994 and the first Native American Gubernatorial Appointee to the Connecticut Historical Commission in 1994. As an author, her first recognized work came in 1992, when she was awarded the first annual Non-Fiction Award of the Native Writers' Circle of the Americas. This accolade was presented for her manuscript, The Lasting of the Mohegans. Zobel later became the first American Indian appointed by Governor Lowell P. Weicker Jr. to the Connecticut Historical Commission.

In 1996, Zobel also received the first annual Chief Little Hatchet Award, given in recognition of her efforts in fostering the survival of the Mohegan people. Melissa Tantaquidgeon Zobel lives in Connecticut with her husband and three children. She won a $10,000 essay contest in 2009 for an essay in which she shared her perspectives on the difficulties and opportunities of the current economic and political landscape. She also won a top national award for The Accomac Business Model.  The contest, called "Native Insight: Thoughts on Recession, Recovery & Opportunity," was sponsored by the Alaska Federation of Natives, in partnership with the National Congress of American Indians and the Council for Native Hawaiian Advancement.

Publications
Wabanaki Blues. Poisoned Pencil, 2015.  
Fire Hollow. Raven's Wing Books, 2010.  
Makiawisug: The Gift of the Little People. Little People Pubns, 1997;   
Medicine Trail: The Life and Lessons of Gladys Tantaquidgeon. University of Arizona Press, 2000.   
Oracles: A Novel. University of New Mexico Press, 2004;   
The Road to Elsewhere. Scribes Valley Publishing; First edition, 2009;   
The Lasting of the Mohegans: Part I, The Story of the Wolf People. The Mohegan Tribe, 1995; ASIN B0006QGXTK

References

1960 births
Living people
Native American writers
American non-fiction writers
Mohegan people
Walsh School of Foreign Service alumni
Fairfield University alumni
American women non-fiction writers
Native American people from Connecticut
20th-century Native Americans
21st-century Native Americans
20th-century Native American women
21st-century Native American women
Native American women writers
20th-century American women writers
21st-century American women writers
Place of birth missing (living people)